Tomoyuki is a masculine Japanese given name.

Possible writings
Tomoyuki can be written using many different combinations of kanji characters. Some examples:

友之, "friend, of"
友幸, "friend, happiness"
友行, "friend, go"
友恭, "friend, respectful"
友志, "friend, determination"
知之, "know, of"
知幸, "know, happiness"
知行, "know, go"
知恭, "know, respectful"
知志, "know, determination"
智之, "intellect, of"
智幸, "intellect, happiness"
智行, "intellect, go"
共行, "together, go"
朋幸, "companion, happiness"
朝之, "morning/dynasty, of"
朝幸, "morning/dynasty, happiness"
朝行, "morning/dynasty, go"

The name can also be written in hiragana ともゆき or katakana トモユキ.

Notable people with the name
, Japanese footballer
, Japanese actor and voice actor
, Japanese film director
, Japanese footballer
, Japanese footballer
, Japanese writer
, Japanese footballer
, Japanese cyclist
, Japanese voice actor
, Japanese baseball player
, Japanese sport shooter
, Japanese computer scientist
, Japanese footballer
, Japanese sailor
, Japanese long-distance runner
, Japanese baseball player
, Japanese footballer
, Japanese film producer
, Japanese Imperial Army general
, Japanese footballer

Japanese masculine given names